Sasakiconcha elegantissima is a species of sea snail, a marine gastropod mollusk in the family Anatomidae.

Description

Distribution
This species occurs in the Pacific Ocean off the Austral Islands, French Polynesia

References

 Geiger D.L. 2006. Sasakiconcha elegantissima new genus and new species (Gastropoda: Vetigastropoda: Anatomidae?) with disjointly coiled base. The Nautilus 120(2): 45–51.
 Geiger D.L. (2012) Monograph of the little slit shells. Volume 1. Introduction, Scissurellidae. pp. 1-728. Volume 2. Anatomidae, Larocheidae, Depressizonidae, Sutilizonidae, Temnocinclidae. pp. 729–1291. Santa Barbara Museum of Natural History Monographs Number 7

External links

Anatomidae
Gastropods described in 2006